Khokhewal is a village in Nurmahal, a sub-tehsil in the Jalandhar district of the Indian state of Punjab.

About 
Khokhewal is 1 km from the Phillaur-Talwan road. The nearest railway station to Khokhewal is at Bilga, a distance of 4 km.

Post code 
Khokhewal's post code is 144036.

References 

Villages in Jalandhar district